A torque tube system is a power transmission and braking technology that involves a stationary housing around the drive shaft, often used in automobiles with a front engine and rear drive. The torque tube consists of a large diameter stationary housing between the transmission and rear end that fully encloses a rotating tubular steel or small-diameter solid drive shaft (known colloquially in the U.S. as a "rope drive") that transmits the power of the engine to a regular or limited-slip differential. The purpose of a torque tube is to hold the rear end in place during acceleration and braking. Otherwise, the axle housing would suffer axle wrap, such that the front of the differential would lift up excessively during acceleration and sink down during braking. Its use is not as widespread in modern automobiles as is the Hotchkiss drive, which holds the rear end in place and prevents it from flipping up or down, during acceleration and braking, by anchoring the axle housings to the leaf springs using spring perches.

Construction 

The "torque" that is referred to in the name is not that of the driveshaft, along the axis of the car, but that applied by the wheels. The engineering problem that the torque tube solves is how to get the traction forces generated by the wheels to the car frame. The torque moving the wheels and axles in a forward direction is met with an "equal and opposite" reaction of the axle housing and differential, making the differential want to spin in a reverse direction, in the same way that a cyclist "pops a wheelie", lifting the bicycle in the air in the opposite direction from the turn of the wheel. The essential problem is how to keep the differential from rotating during acceleration and braking. The torque tube solves that problem by coupling the differential housing to the transmission housing and therefore propels the car forward by pushing up on the engine/transmission and then through the engine mounts to the car frame, with the reverse happening during braking. In contrast, the Hotchkiss drive transmits the traction forces to the car frame by using suspension components such as leaf springs or trailing arms.

A type of ball and socket joint called a "torque ball" is used at one end of the torque tube to allow relative motion between the axle and transmission due to suspension travel. Later American Motors Rambler models (1962 through 1966) used a flange and cushion mount in place of the ball and socket. Since the torque tube does not constrain the car's body to the axle in the lateral (side-to-side) direction a panhard rod is often used for this purpose. The combination of the panhard rod and the torque tube allows the easy implementation of soft coil springs in the rear to give good ride quality, as in Buicks after 1937. Before 1937, Buicks used leaf springs, so the panhard rod was not used, though the torque tube allowed a cantilever spring suspension, which gives a softer ride than a center-mount axle on the leaf spring, as required by the Hotchkiss setup.

In addition to transmitting traction forces, the torque tube is hollow and contains the rotating driveshaft. Inside the hollow torque ball is the universal joint of the driveshaft that allows relative motion between the two ends of the driveshaft. In most applications the drive shaft uses a single universal joint which has the disadvantage that it causes speed fluctuations in the driveshaft when the shaft is not straight. The Hotchkiss drive uses two universal joints, which has the effect of canceling the speed fluctuations and gives a constant speed even when the shaft is no longer straight . V8-powered models of the 1963-1966 AMC Rambler used a double-Cardan constant velocity joint to eliminate driveshaft fluctuations, though six-cylinder and earlier V8 models used only one standard universal joint.

The torque tube design is typically heavier and securely ties the rear end together, thus providing for a rigid rear end and assuring good alignment under all conditions. However, because of the greater unsprung weight of the torque tube and radius rods, there may be a "little hopping around of the rear end when cornering fast or on washboard roads".

Application 
Examples of the torque tube were the American cars of the Ford brand up through 1948, including over 19,000,000 Model Ts. Ford used the less expensive transverse springs that could not take forward thrust. For many of those years, Chevrolet used the torque tube, while Buick used it starting in 1906 (in the model D). The torque tube also allowed Buick, beginning in 1938, to use coil springs for a softer ride than traditional leaf springs, which can use a Hotchkiss drive, but coil springs cannot. Buick's use of a torque tube and coil springs became a Buick "engineering trademark", until it was dropped with the 1961 model year full-sized models. 
The Nash 600 model adopted torque-tube drive in 1941 without an enclosed joint, but utilized a "horizontal yoke at the front end of the torque tube is supported by rubber biscuits at each side."

After the merger of Nash and Hudson in 1954, American Motors Corporation (AMC) continued to use the coil spring and torque tube rear suspension design on their large-sized cars (Rambler Classic and Ambassador) from the 1956 through the 1966 model year. The enclosed driveshaft made for more complicated gear swaps and hampered hot rodders. The discontinued torque-tube drive was replaced by a completely new open driveshaft and four-link axle-location system.

The 1961 Pontiac Tempest was introduced as a new model, featuring an inline 4 coupled to a transaxle via a torque tube, giving it a perfect 50-50 front-rear weight balance.

The Peugeot 403 and 404 models used a torque tube. The Peugeot 504, and Peugeot 505 estate/station wagons, as well as most export-market sedans also had torque tubes, while domestic and European-market sedan models had a transaxle and individual rear suspension.

The Chevrolet Chevette (1976-1988) and the similar Pontiac T-1000 used a torque tube and center bearing. This design was unlike any other Chevrolet model "to isolate impacts to the rear wheels, cut down on road noise, and reduce engine vibration ... also allows a reduction in the height of the drive shaft and tunnel."

The continuing limited production of the Avanti switched to a new chassis in 1986 that utilized a torque tube along with an independent rear suspension.

The Mercedes SLS has a torque tube, but only to align the transaxle with the engine.

The Chevrolet Corvette has used a torque tube since the 1996 introduction of the C5 version in the 1997 model year.

References 

Automotive transmission technologies